Sharkstooth Peak, 11,691', is a mountain in the Rocky Mountains in Montezuma County, Colorado.

Historical names
Sharkstooth
Sharkstooth Peak – 1949 
Sharktooth Peak

See also

List of Colorado mountain ranges
List of Colorado mountain summits
List of Colorado fourteeners
List of Colorado 4000 meter prominent summits
List of the most prominent summits of Colorado
List of Colorado county high points

References

External links

Mountains of Colorado
Mountains of Montezuma County, Colorado
North American 3000 m summits